The  is an early Japanese Internet urban legend about a red pop-up ad which announces the forthcoming death of the person who encounters it on their computer screen. It may have its origin in an Adobe Flash horror animation of the late 1990s that tells the story of the legend.

Legend 
There are several variations of the Red Room Curse urban legend. According to the most common one, while browsing the Internet the victim will be presented with a red pop-up with a black text saying "Do you like — ?" (あなたは〜好きですか?). After trying to close it, the pop-up will reappear, this time the text saying "Do you like the red room?" (あなたは赤い部屋が好きですか?). Then, the screen will turn red, displaying a list of names of the Red Room's victims. The target will sense a mysterious presence behind them, after which they will lose consciousness. They will later be found dead in their home, with the walls of the room in which they are discovered "painted red with blood".

Origin and spread 
In the late 1990s, a Japanese interactive Adobe Flash horror animation, considered to be the origin of the Red Room Curse urban legend, was uploaded to GeoCities. It told the story of a young boy who was cursed and died after seeing the pop-up. The legend of the curse gained notoriety in 2004 due to the Sasebo slashing – the murder of a 12-year-old schoolgirl by an 11-year-old classmate referred to as "Girl A" at an elementary school in Sasebo. "Girl A" was reported to be a fan of the Red Room Curse animation, having the video bookmarked on her computer at the time of the murder. The webpage in question is currently inaccessible using conventional methods due to the discontinuation of Geocities and Adobe Flash.

In 2016, a short film titled The Red Room Curse inspired by the urban legend was released.

References 

Japanese urban legends
Flash games
Creepypasta